Jean-Marie Mokole  is a member of the Pan-African Parliament from the Central African Republic. Makole became the rapporteur for Rural Economy, Agriculture, Natural Resources and Environment in 2009.

References

Year of birth missing (living people)
Living people
Members of the Pan-African Parliament from the Central African Republic